Deoxyguanosine kinase, mitochondrial is an enzyme that in humans is encoded by the DGUOK gene.

Function 

In mammalian cells, the phosphorylation of purine deoxyribonucleosides is mediated predominantly by two deoxyribonucleoside kinases, cytosolic deoxycytidine kinase and mitochondrial deoxyguanosine kinase. The protein encoded by this gene is responsible for phosphorylation of purine deoxyribonucleosides in the mitochondrial matrix. In addition, this protein phosphorylates several purine deoxyribonucleoside analogs used in the treatment of lymphoproliferative disorders, and this phosphorylation is critical for the effectiveness of the analogs. Alternative splice variants encoding different protein isoforms have been described for this gene.

Clinical 
Mutations in this gene have been linked to inherited mitochondrial DNA depletion syndromes, neonatal liver failure, nystagmus and hypotonia.

References

Further reading

External links 
 GeneReview/NIH/UW entry on DGUOK-Related Mitochondrial DNA Depletion Syndrome, Hepatocerebral Form